The 1993–94 Macedonian First League was the 2nd season of the Macedonian First Football League, the highest football league of Macedonia. The first matches of the season were played on 22 August 1993 and the last on 12 June 1994. Vardar defended their championship title, having won their second title in a row.

Promotion and relegation 

1 Karaorman was relegated from the First League after a loss in a relegation tie-breaker match against Borec.

Participating teams

League table

Results

Relegation tie-breaker 

|}

Borec was stayed and Karaorman was relegated to the Second League.Source:

Top goalscorers

See also 
 1993–94 Macedonian Football Cup
 1993–94 Macedonian Second Football League

References

External links 
 Macedonia - List of final tables (RSSSF)
 Football Federation of Macedonia

Macedonia
1
Macedonian First Football League seasons